The Torino Hut (French: Refuge Turin) is a high mountain refuge in the Alps in northwestern Italy. The refuge is in the Mont Blanc massif above the town of Courmayeur in the Aosta Valley, Italy. It can be most easily accessed from the Italian side by the Skyway Monte Bianco cable car from La Palud in Courmayeur, with a change at the Pavilion du Mont Fréty. It can also be reached from Chamonix via the Aiguille du Midi, either by cable car which crosses the massif, or by a long crossing of the Glacier du Gèant. The refuge lies nearly directly above the  Mont Blanc Tunnel, which passes deep underground, and connects Courmayer to Chamonix.

Description

The original hut was built by the Turin section of the Italian Alpine Club in 1898, near the cable car station. Over time, the refuge was enlarged several times, and today accommodates 38 guests.

The new refuge is accessible by an internal staircase equipped with a service lift for skis and mountaineering equipment. A panoramic trail, accessible during the summer, also leads to the new refuge.

From the refuge, climbers can descent to the Toula Glacier or the Vallée Blanche, or do one of the numerous ascents on ice in the Combe Maudite and Mont Blanc du Tacul basins. Other mountaineering excursions in the area are the Dent du Géant (Giant's Tooth), the Rochefort ridge, the Tour Ronde, the Aiguille d'Entrèves, Aiguilles Marbrées, Grand Capucin, and the Tacul satellites.

In the summer, the hut operates a bar and restaurant with a terrace that offers panoramic views of all the surrounding peaks of the Aosta Valley, the Savoy, and the Valais. Sunbathing in the high mountains is also popular on the terraces.

Nearby summits
The following nearby summits are part of the Mont Blanc massif.
 Mont Maudit – 
 Mont Blanc du Tacul – 
 Dent du Géant –

References

External links
    
Torino Hut and Pointe Helbronner on French  IGN mapping portal

Mountain huts in the Alps
Mountain huts in Aosta Valley
Courmayeur
Mountain huts of Club Alpino Italiano